The 2018 Atlanta Blaze season was the third season for the Atlanta Blaze of Major League Lacrosse. The Blaze created a lot of noise in the preceding offseason period. On September 12, 2017, the Blaze signed former Lizard Tommy Palasek. Later in the month, the Blaze also signed Matt Gibson from the Lizards and acquired Eddy Glazener from the Denver Outlaws for Christian Burgdorf.

On December 18, 2017, Blaze head coach Dave Huntley died unexpectedly at the age of 60. Former MLL player Liam Banks was named his replacement on January 15, 2018, becoming the third head coach in the young team's history.

For the second straight year, the Blaze improved their record, finishing .500 for the first time in franchise history at 7-7. The team entered the final week of the season just needing a win to clinch a playoff spot. However, the Blaze lost a close one to the Denver Outlaws, 15-14.

Milestones and events

Offseason
December 18, 2017 - Head coach Dave Huntley died unexpectedly at the age of 60.
January 9, 2018 - Jim Pfeifer was renamed President of the Blaze. He served the same role for the team from December 2016 to May 2017.
January 15 - Former MLL player Liam Banks was named the third head coach in Blaze history.
April 18 - Commissioner Sandy Brown announces the sale of the Blaze to Andre Gudger, founder and CEO of technology investment company Eccalon.

Regular season
May 31 - The Blaze make a flurry of trades and acquire faceoff specialist Joe Nardella from the Boston Cannons, and send Jake Withers to the Charlotte Hounds in exchange for a 2019 second round draft pick.
July 25 - Major League Lacrosse announces the site of the All Star Games for 2019, 2020, and 2021. After hosting the championship games from 2014 to 2016, Atlanta will host its first All Star Game in 2020.

Schedule

Regular season

Standings

References

External links
 Team Website

Major League Lacrosse seasons
Atlanta Blaze